24: Live Another Day (also known as Season 9 or Day 9) is a 24 limited event television series that premiered on May 5, 2014, and concluded on July 14, 2014, airing on Fox. Sky 1 simulcast the premiere on May 6 in the United Kingdom and Ireland but switched to Wednesday nights for the rest of the episodes. It began airing in Australia on Network Ten on May 12, 2014. Set four years after the events of season 8, it adheres to the real time concept of covering the events of a 24-hour period and begins and ends at 11:00 a.m. However, there is a 12-hour time jump within the final episode.

Season overview
Live Another Day takes place four years after the events of season 8. James Heller, now President of the United States of America, is negotiating a treaty with British Prime Minister Alastair Daives in London, where a hacker collective led by hacker Adrian Cross preaching freedom of information known as Open Cell has enlisted the help of ex-Counter Terrorist Unit Data Analyst Chloe O'Brian. Ex-CTU Agent and federal fugitive Jack Bauer, who has been tracking the activities of Chloe's group while living in exile and being hunted by the CIA, resurfaces when he hears of an imminent assassination attempt on Heller's life.

There are two main acts in Live Another Day:
 Margot Al-Harazi gains control of six US drones and uses them to attack London.
 Cheng Zhi attacks his former country China with hijacked American weapons bringing the two countries to the brink of war.

Major subplots
 Jack Bauer disapproves of the group Chloe O'Brian has joined.
 Margot Al-Harazi grows suspicious of where her daughter's loyalties lie.
 James Heller tries to manage a crisis amid the onset of Alzheimer's disease.
 Mark Boudreau opens himself up to blackmail by forging Heller's signature.
 Kate Morgan has been led to believe that her husband committed treason by selling state secrets.
 The head of the CIA London station, Steve Navarro, is conspiring with the leader of Chloe's group.
 CIA analyst Jordan Reed's hunt for answers puts his life into jeopardy.
 Circumstances reunite Jack and Audrey after nearly a decade.
 America's plans for a treaty are derailed when they lose control of their own weapons.
 Cheng Zhi partners with the Russians who are looking for Jack.

Summary
While anti-drone protesters gather outside the United States Embassy, where President of the United States James Heller is staying, agents at a CIA station in London find and apprehend federal fugitive and former Counter Terrorist Unit Agent Jack Bauer. Due to her husband's conviction, CIA Agent Kate Morgan is being forced to resign. However, she gets herself reinstated when she realizes that Jack is infiltrating the CIA to gain access to ex-CTU Data Analyst turned hacktivist Chloe O'Brian. Kate is too late to intervene and Jack breaks Chloe out of interrogation with the help of his friend Belcheck, an ex-Serbian Mob enforcer. Still distrustful of Chloe, Jack follows her to Open Cell, a hacker collective that specializes in leaking government documents and preaching freedom of information. He explains that he is on the trail of Derrick Yates, a former Open Cell member who has become involved in an assassination attempt on James Heller. The attempt is revealed to involve drones when he programs an unmanned aerial vehicle to fire on British and American troops. The pilot, United States Air Force First Lieutenant Chris Tanner, is falsely arrested on murder charges.

Jack and Chloe learn that Yates' device has been taken by Margot Al-Harazi, a designated terrorist trying to avenge the death of her husband, Mahmoud. When their attempt to capture her daughter Simone fails, Jack breaks into the United States Embassy to analyze Tanner's flight key and prove that the threat is imminent. Jack locks himself in a room with three hostages and tries to upload the data to Open Cell's leader, Adrian Cross. Marines break in before the upload finishes but Kate Morgan is able to place him in CIA custody instead. In the President's quarters, Chief of Staff Mark Boudreau expresses concerns that Bauer is a designated terrorist and drafts an agreement for extraditing him to Russia. Suspecting that dementia has clouded Heller's judgement, he forges the President's signature and vows to protect his wife Audrey from any further pain related to Bauer. Jack is ultimately proven right when Margot broadcasts a video calling for Heller to turn himself in or face attacks on London from six U.S. drones.

When Simone's husband Navid tries to sabotage the attacks, Margot executes Navid, leaving her son Ian to pilot the drones, she sends Simone to silence Navid's family. When a missile kills several CIA Agents, Heller authorizes Bauer to go undercover with an arms dealer known for working with Al-Harazi. From transaction records, they are able to track Simone and see that she has been struck by traffic in her pursuit of Navid's niece. When Margot learns that Simone is being interrogated in the hospital, she sends a drone to destroy it. Jack and Kate escape with Simone and convince her to reveal Margot's last known whereabouts. The subsequent raid uncovers enough information to give Chloe access to the drone's camera. Meanwhile, CIA Analyst Jordan Reed uncovers evidence that Kate's husband Adam Morgan may have been innocent all along. CIA Station Chief Steve Navarro arranges to have him assassinated in order to cover up his own involvement in selling intel to China and framing Morgan. The assassination does not go as planned and leads to the deaths of both Agent Reed and the hitman.

With Margot's deadline approaching, Heller decides to turn himself in and put an end to the civilian losses though he first pardons Jack for his crimes. Jack delivers Heller to Wembley Stadium where Margot's drone is waiting but convinces him to turn back when Chloe devises a plan to loop the video feed. Thinking that Heller is still inside, Margot and Ian fire on the stadium and then sink five of the six rogue drones. Upon learning that Heller is alive, Margot and Ian try to attack Waterloo station with the last drone. Jack arrives with a CIA tactical team before this can happen and kills both of them. Jack takes Yates' device back to the CIA to be analyzed. Upon arriving, he learns that Jordan's body has been found by and identifies the second body as an assassin called James Harman, an ex-CIA Agent and ex-United States Navy SEAL, working for Navarro. Before Jack can apprehend him, Navarro escapes with the device and delivers it to Adrian Cross. Adrian explains to Chloe that some underground dealings with China are needed to finance their activism and takes her to an Open Cell chapter. They find that all of their colleagues have been murdered by ex-Chinese official turned terrorist Cheng Zhi, who wants to reprogram the override to start a war between the United States and China. Cheng kills Adrian, kidnaps Chloe and fabricates a torpedo launch order for an American submarine that sinks a Chinese aircraft carrier.

Russian Deputy Foreign Minister Anatol Stolnavich contacts Boudreau about the rendition order. When Boudreau tries to withdraw it, Stolnavich threatens to reveal that the signature has been forged. Boudreau co-operates and gives him access to a frequency used by Bauer. As a result, Jack is attacked by Russian agents working for Stolnavich on his way to retrieve the override and Cheng has time to escape. Upon discovering that his encrypted frequency was given to the Russians from within the White House, Bauer confronts Boudreau and tells him that Russia will benefit if the United States and China go to war. Heller immediately arrests Boudreau for treason but then delays custody, allowing Boudreau to assist Jack in the raid of a Russian diplomatic compound in which Stolnavich resides in. He distracts Stolnavich long enough for Jack and Kate to break in but Stolnavich dies in the ensuing struggle. Audrey meets with a contact of hers, the daughter of a high-ranking Chinese official, hoping to convince her that the naval attacks were perpetrated by Cheng and not the American government. Even though Cheng is unable to stop Chloe from escaping, he uses a sniper and has Audrey's Secret Service detail killed. He contacts Bauer saying that Audrey will die unless he gets safe passage out of England.

From the files in Stolnavich's compound Jack finds out how Cheng is planning to escape and sends Kate to rescue Audrey without attracting attention. Chloe re-establishes contact with Jack and sets up satellite surveillance of the freighter that Cheng has boarded. While Jack and Belcheck raid the ship, Kate eliminates the sniper and tells them that Audrey is safe. However, a second shooter in the area fires several shots and Audrey dies in Kate's arms. Devastated by her loss, Jack kills all of Cheng's bodyguards and transmits proof of Cheng's whereabouts to President Heller and President Wei, the President of China. He kills Cheng immediately after the authenticity is verified. As the military advances are called off, Heller is told that his daughter is dead and Jack and Belcheck see that Chloe has gone missing again. Jack receives a phone call from the Russians demanding that he turn himself in to them.

Twelve hours later, Kate resigns from the CIA out of regret and Mark awaits trial for committing treason in his attempt to save Audrey. Heller is left to mourn his daughter as his memories start to fade away, and Jack reluctantly gives himself up to Russian agents in exchange for Chloe's freedom despite being pardoned by Heller.

Characters

Starring
 Kiefer Sutherland as Jack Bauer (12 episodes)
 Yvonne Strahovski as Kate Morgan (12 episodes)
 Tate Donovan as Mark Boudreau (12 episodes)
 Mary Lynn Rajskub as Chloe O'Brian (12 episodes)
 William Devane as President James Heller (12 episodes)
 Gbenga Akinnagbe as Erik Ritter (11 episodes)
 Giles Matthey as Jordan Reed (9 episodes)
 Michael Wincott as Adrian Cross (10 episodes)
 Benjamin Bratt as Steve Navarro (10 episodes)
 Kim Raver as Audrey Boudreau (12 episodes)

Guest starring

Production
In May 2013, Deadline Hollywood first reported that Fox was considering a limited-run "event series" for 24 based on a concept by Howard Gordon, after failed efforts to produce the 24 feature film and the cancellation of Kiefer Sutherland's series Touch. David Fury confirmed on Twitter that he would also be involved, pulling "double duty" with Gordon's new series Tyrant. The following week, Fox officially announced 24: Live Another Day, a limited-run series of twelve episodes that would feature the return of Jack Bauer. Fox CEO Kevin Reilly said that the series would essentially represent the twelve "most important" hours of a typical 24 season, with jumps forward between hours as needed. As with the rest of Fox's push into event programming, the production will have "a big scope and top talent and top marketing budgets."

In the press release, Gordon said:

Kiefer Sutherland, who was confirmed to executive produce and star in the new series, added:

In June 2013, it was announced that former 24 director Jon Cassar was signed on as executive producer and director of Live Another Day, directing six of the twelve episodes. The remaining six episodes were given to former 24 director and producer Milan Cheylov, and new 24 directors, Adam Kane and Omar Madha. Executive producers and writers Robert Cochran, Manny Coto and Evan Katz were also announced to return.  Sean Callery returned as the music composer for the series.

The writing process began on July 1, 2013, with David Fury pitching the first episode, which was tentatively titled "6:30–7:30". On July 11, 2013, executive producer Brian Grazer announced in an interview that the 24 miniseries would "be a limited series that would then spin off into a series itself. Fox is doing it, Fox studio and Fox network, and we're totally thrilled by that." In October 2013, it was confirmed the series would be set and filmed in London, England, United Kingdom. Pre-production and location scouting by the crew, including Jon Cassar, began in November 2013. The production offices for Live Another Day were based in the Gillette Building in west London, previously used for Red 2. Production began on January 6, 2014.

In a May 2014 press release, Fox billed the eighth episode as the franchise's 200th episode.

Trailer
A promotional video was shot on January 22, 2014, with filming beginning for the series on January 26. The first teaser for the show aired on Sky1 on January 21, 2014, but did not show any new footage. The first American trailer, titled "Street Chaos", followed four 10-second teasers during Super Bowl XLVIII on February 2, 2014, but didn't show any footage from the series. Also, a promotional image was sent to Entertainment Weekly on February 20, 2014.

In March, another promo with actual footage was released, showing the President of the United States arriving in London; Bauer being spotted there on camera by the CIA; and him telling Chloe that "there's no going home" for him. A 20-minute preview of Live Another Day was released by Fox on April 7 and broadcast on May 3.

Casting
Kiefer Sutherland was immediately cast as Jack Bauer on May 13, 2013. Mary Lynn Rajskub was announced as the second official cast member in August 2013, reprising her role as Chloe O'Brian. In October 2013, it was confirmed that Kim Raver and William Devane would reprise their roles as Audrey Raines and James Heller, respectively.

The first new character to be cast was Michael Wincott's hacker character Adrian Cross. One month later, two more characters were added to the cast: CIA agents Erik Ritter and Jordan Reed played by Gbenga Akinnagbe and Giles Matthey respectively. On December 19, 2013, it was announced that three-time Primetime Emmy Award winner Judy Davis had joined the cast as the villain Margot Al-Harazi. However, Davis later exited the role for "personal family matters"; the role was recast with Michelle Fairley. On January 13, at a TCA panel discussing the show, it was announced that Yvonne Strahovski would play CIA Agent Kate Morgan. Benjamin Bratt was cast as her boss Steve Navarro.

On January 21, Tate Donovan was cast as Heller's Chief of Staff and the husband of Audrey Raines, Mark Boudreau. On January 24, Stephen Fry was cast as the British Prime Minister Trevor Davies, later renamed Alastair Davies. On the same day, relatively unknown actor Charles Furness was cast in a "small guest part" as Peter, a member of Chloe's hacker group. On January 26, Ross McCall was revealed to have acted in Live Another Day by Jon Cassar playing Ron Clark, assistant of Mark Boudreau. The next day, John Boyega was announced to be playing drone pilot Chris Tanner. Among the last actors to have his role announced was Colin Salmon playing U.S. General Coburn.

24: Solitary
Solitary is a story extension included in the Live Another Day Blu-ray set which was released on September 30, 2014. It takes place approximately three years after the events of Live Another Day and features the return of Carlos Bernard as Tony Almeida as he attempts to be released from solitary confinement. In Solitary, Tony requests to be moved from solitary confinement to general population, in an interview with a Department of Justice attorney and the prison administrator. Tony explains that he could supply inside information to the government regarding other criminals, such as Mexican cartels and al-Qaeda. When the request is denied, and a guard uncuffs him, he attacks the attorney, throwing her to the ground. During the attack, Tony is able to take her glasses without anyone noticing. Later, the attorney calls a man to confirm that Tony has the plans. Back in his cell, Tony puts on the glasses, which reveal they have escape plans in the lenses.

Episodes

Reception 

24: Live Another Day received positive reviews from critics. On review aggregator site Rotten Tomatoes the series has an approval rating of 82% based on 55 reviews, with an average rating of 7.3/10. The site's critical consensus reads, "Filled with strong action sequences, 24: Live Another Day is a return to the formula that made the original series popular – though it also suffers from familiarity and sameness." On Metacritic the series has a score of 70 out of 100, based on 40 critics, indicating "generally favorable reviews".

The season's finale was met with critical acclaim, with reviewers praising the performances by Kiefer Sutherland and William Devane, the mix of fast action and emotionally wrenching content and the skilled use of emphatic silences.

The series was nominated for Best Stunt Team at the 21st Screen Actors Guild Awards and for Best Limited Series and Best Actor at the 5th Critics' Choice Television Awards. It also received three nominations for the 67th Primetime Emmy Awards.

Ratings

Award nominations

Home media releases

See also
List of fictional prime ministers of the United Kingdom

References

External links
 
 
 

 
2014 American television seasons
American political drama television series
Television shows set in London
Terrorism in television
Television series by 20th Century Fox Television
Works about the Central Intelligence Agency